The 1914 Wimbledon Championships took place on the outdoor grass courts at the All England Lawn Tennis and Croquet Club in Wimbledon, London, United Kingdom. The tournament ran from 22 June until 4 July. It was the 38th staging of the Wimbledon Championships, and the first Grand Slam tennis event of 1914. It was the last championship before a four-year hiatus due to World War I.

Champions

Men's singles

 Norman Brookes defeated  Anthony Wilding 6–4, 6–4, 7–5

Women's singles

 Dorothea Lambert Chambers defeated  Ethel Thomson Larcombe 7–5, 6–4

Men's doubles

 Norman Brookes /  Anthony Wilding defeated  Herbert Roper Barrett /  Charles Dixon 6–1, 6–1, 5–7, 8–6

Women's doubles

 Agnes Morton /  Elizabeth Ryan defeated  Edith Hannam /  Ethel Larcombe 6–1, 6–3

Mixed doubles

 James Cecil Parke /  Ethel Larcombe defeated  Anthony Wilding /  Marguerite Broquedis 4–6, 6–4, 6–2

References

External links
 Official Wimbledon Championships website

 
Wimbledon Championships
Wimbledon Championships
Wimbledon Championships
Wimbledon Championships